Patricia Margaret Crossin (born 21 March 1956) is a former Australian politician, who served as a Senator for the Northern Territory from June 1998 to September 2013, representing the Australian Labor Party.

Crossin was born in Melbourne and was educated at Deakin University, where she graduated in education. She worked as a teacher, and was an industrial officer of the National Tertiary Education Union between 1996 and 1998.

In 1998, she was appointed by the Northern Territory Legislative Assembly to fill the casual senate vacancy created by the resignation of Senator Bob Collins. Crossin was Deputy Opposition Whip in the Senate 2001–2004.

Crossin was informed by the Prime Minister Julia Gillard on Monday 21 January 2013, before a public announcement a day later, that she would not have her backing as the Senate candidate for the 2013 Australian federal election, and that the Prime Minister would be supporting the former Olympian Gold Medallist and Aboriginal activist Nova Peris. On 20 October 2015 she became a director of the Indigenous Land and Sea Corporation.

Crossin is married to Mark Crossin, and has four children.

References

External links
Trish Crossin, Senator for the Northern Territory, First Speech – 1998-06-24

1956 births
Living people
Australian Labor Party members of the Parliament of Australia
Labor Left politicians
Members of the Australian Senate
Members of the Australian Senate for the Northern Territory
Women members of the Australian Senate
Politicians from Melbourne
Deakin University alumni
21st-century Australian politicians
21st-century Australian women politicians
20th-century Australian politicians
20th-century Australian women politicians